The 2010 Long Teng Cup was an international football competition held in Kaohsiung, Chinese Taipei from 8 October 2010 to 12 October 2010. 

The edition featured three senior national teams and Hong Kong national under-23 football team which was preparing for the 2010 Asian Games.

Participating nations

 (Hosts)

Matches

Round robin tournament 
All times are National Standard Time – UTC+8

Winner

Goal scorers 
4 goals
 Ian Araneta

3 goals
 Lo Chih-an

2 goals

 Lam Hok Hei
 Lo Kwan Yee
 Xu Deshuai
 Phil Younghusband
 Chen Po-hao

1 goal

 Chan Man Fai
 Ju Yingzhi
 Tam Lok Hin
 Leong Ka Hang
 Emelio Caligdong
 James Younghusband
 Chang Han
 Chen Po-liang
 Lin Cheng-yi
 Lo Chih-en

2010
2010 in Taiwanese football
2010–11 in Hong Kong football
2010 in Macau football
2010 in Philippine football